War against Islam is a term used to describe a concerted effort to harm, weaken or annihilate the societal system of Islam, using military, economic, social and cultural means, or means invading and interfering in Islamic countries under the pretext of the war on terror, or using the media to create a negative stereotype about Islam. The perpetrators of the theory are thought to be non-Muslims, particularly the Western world and "false Muslims", allegedly in collusion with political actors in the Western world. While the contemporary narrative of the "War against Islam" mostly covers general issues of societal transformations in modernization and secularization as well as general issues of international power politics among modern states, the crusades are often narrated as its alleged starting point.

The phrase or similar phrases have been used by Islamists such as Sayyid Qutb, Ayatollah Khomeini, Anwar al-Awlaki, Osama bin Laden, Chechen militant Dokka Umarov, cleric Anjem Choudary, and Fort Hood shooter Nidal Hasan. It has also been used in propaganda by al-Qaida and the Islamic State of Iraq and the Levant. The English-language political neologism of "War on Islam" was coined in Islamist discourse in the 1990s and popularized as a conspiracy theory only after 2001.

Pro-Israel author Jonathan Schanzer has argued that the historical Muslim indifference to the West turned to "alarmed dislike" with the beginning of Western military superiority in the 17th century. However, with the end of the era of Western colonialism, rage against non-Muslims and the governments of Muslim-majority countries stems not from alleged non-Muslim aggression and enmity, but allegedly from frustration over the unrelenting encroachment of mostly Western culture, technology, economies, and from a yearning for a "return to the glorious days when Islam reigned supreme."

Usage of the term and concept

The most influential Islamists who have alleged a broad malicious conspiracy against the societal system of Islam are:

Sayyid Qutb

From the background of the Muslim Brotherhood organization and ideology, Sayyid Qutb, possibly the most influential Islamist author, often described as "the man whose ideas would shape Al Qaeda", also preached that the West was not just in conflict with Islam but plotting against it. In his book Milestones, first published in 1964, he wrote:

The Western ways of thought … [have] an enmity toward all religion, and in particular with greater hostility toward Islam. This enmity toward Islam is especially pronounced and many times is the result of a well-thought-out scheme the object of which is first to shake the foundations of Islamic beliefs and then gradually to demolish the structure of Muslim society.

Olivier Roy has described Qutb's attitude as one of "radical contempt and hatred" for the West, and complains that the propensity of Muslims like Qutb to blame problems on outside conspiracies "is currently paralyzing Muslim political thought. For to say that every failure is the devil's work is the same as asking God, or the devil himself (which is to say these days the Americans), to solve one's problems."

Among the early books following Qutb is Qadat al-gharb yaquluman: dammiru al-Islam, ubidu ahlahu (Western Leaders Are Saying: Destroy Islam, Annihilate All of Its People) written by Jalal `Alam and published in 1977.

Ayatollah Khomeini
Ayatollah Ruhollah Khomeini, the Shia Islamist leader of the 1979 Iranian Revolution and founder of the Islamic Republic of Iran, preached that Western imperialists or neoimperialists sought to make Muslims suffer, to "plunder" their resources and other wealth, and had to undermine Islam first because Islam stood in the way of this stealing and immiseration. Khomeini claims some of the alleged Western plots being not recent but hundreds of years old.

[Europeans] have known the power of Islam themselves for it once ruled part of Europe, and they know that true Islam is opposed to their activities. (...) From the very outset, therefore, they have sought to remove this obstacle from their path by disparaging Islam (...). They have resorted to malicious propaganda (...). The agents of imperialism are busy in every corner of the Islamic world drawing our youth away from us with their evil propaganda. They are destroying Islam! Agents – both foreigners sent by the imperialists and natives employed by them – have spread out into every village and region of Iran and are leading our children and young people astray.

Osama bin Laden
From a Salafist perspective, Osama bin Laden emphasizes the alleged war and urges Muslims to take arms against it in almost all of his written or recorded messages. In his 1998 fatwa where he declared the killing of "Americans and their allies—civilians and military—is an individual duty for every Muslim who can do it in any country in which it is possible to do it," bin Laden listed three reasons for the fatwa: the presence of US troops in Saudi Arabia, the increase in infant mortality in Iraq following US-supported sanctions there, and US aid to Israel.

All these crimes and sins committed by the Americans are a clear declaration of war on Allah, his messenger, and Muslims. What bears no doubt in this fierce Judeo-Christian campaign against the Muslim world, the likes of which has never been seen before, is that the Muslims must prepare all possible might to repel the enemy (...). Every day, from east to west, our umma of 1200 million Muslims is being slaughtered (...) We (...) see events not as isolated incidents, but as part of a long chain of conspiracies, a war of annihilation (...). The West (...) will not be able to respect others' beliefs or feelings. (...) They regard jihad for the sake of God or defending one's self or his country as an act of terror.

Allegations relating to the supposed War against Islam

Islamic tradition and history
According to scholar David B. Cook, a religious studies professor at Rice University, what some believe is scriptural evidence for the existence of the alleged "War against Islam" is found in a popular hadith, one that supposedly prophesies a war against Islam is the "Tradition of Thawban":
The Messenger of God said: The nations are about to flock against you [the Muslims] from every horizon, just as hungry people flock to a kettle. We said: O Messenger of God, will we be few on that day? He said: No, you will be many in number, but you will be scum, like the scum of a flash-flood, without any weight, since fear will be removed from the hearts of your enemies, and weakness (wahn) will be placed in your hearts. We said: O Messenger of God, what does the word wahn mean? He said: Love of this world, and fear of death.Others maintain the hadith or similar ones are authentic. 
Cook claims that the idea of a Western war against the societal system of Islam is a belief "at the heart of the radical Muslim and especially the globalist radical Muslim;" a factor "binding globalist radical Muslims together."

Western supporters of the belief in ingrained Western hatred/hostility of Islam include historian Roger Savory, and Boston-based novelist and author James Carroll. According to Savory, Christendom felt threatened by Islam and its march into Europe, (the Muslim Umayyad Caliphate advanced into Europe as far as northern France before being defeated at the Battle of Tours in 732; the Muslim Ottoman Empire attempted to conquer Vienna twice, laying siege to the city in 1485 and 1683), and thus became hostile to it.

Alleged legacy of the Crusades
Islamists who use this term often point to the Crusades and European colonization, believing it to be an example of an attempt to destroy the Muslim way of life. Sayyid Qutb, for example,  not only believed the West had "a well-thought-out scheme the object of which is first to shake the foundations of Islamic beliefs," but maintained that the medieval Christian Crusades were not "a form of imperialism," but rather Western imperialism was a new form of the Crusades, "latter-day" imperialism in Muslim lands being "but a mask for the crusading spirit." Savory says: It is not surprising, therefore, to find a great similarity between the medieval view that it was safe to speak ill of Muhammad because his malignity exceeded whatever ill could be spoken of him, and the tone of nineteenth-century missionary tracts which exhorted the Muslims in India to abandon the false religion which they had been taught. There were even echos of the old crusading spirit. When the French occupied Algeria in 1830, they declared that they had in mind 'the greatest benefit to Christendom'. Similarly, Canning's solution to the 'problem' of the Ottoman empire was to bring it into modern Europe under Christian tutelage. When the French invaded Tunis in 1881, they considered their action a sacred duty 'which a superior civilisation owes to the populations which are less advanced'.

On September 16, 2001, President George W. Bush referred to the war in Afghanistan as a Crusade: "This crusade, this war on terrorism is going to take a while. And the American people must be patient. I'm going to be patient." 

In contrast, historian Bernard Lewis points out that the Crusaders had strong motives to wage the Crusade other than the denigration of Islam. The lands they attempted to recover were the lands where Christianity was founded, including "the holy land where Christ had lived, taught and died", and where  "a substantial proportion of the population ... perhaps even a majority, was still Christian", since "not much more than four centuries had passed since the Arab Muslim conquerors had wrested theses lands from Christendom". Rather than the Crusades leaving a psychological scar passed down through the ages among Muslims, the Arabs of the time did not refer to the Crusaders as Crusaders or Christians but as Franks or Infidels, and "with few exceptions", the Muslim historians of the time showed "little interest in whence or why the Franks had come, and report their arrival and their departure with equal lack of curiosity".

Modern-day events

The alleged perpetrators of the "War on Islam" include Western powers (especially the United States), pro-Western Muslim states regimes (e.g. Jordan, Egypt, Saudi Arabia, Kuwait, Qatar, UAE, Bahrain, Oman, Pakistan) and non-Western, non-Muslim states such as Israel (Israeli–Palestinian conflict), Myanmar (Rohingya genocide), Serbia (Massacre in Bosnia), Russia (Chechen–Russian conflict), India (for the conflict in Kashmir), and more recently China (for the Xinjiang conflict). Osama bin Laden mentions: "Meanwhile, a UN resolution passed more than half a century ago gave Muslim Kashmir the liberty of choosing independence from India and Kashmir. George Bush, the leader of the Crusaders' campaign, announced a few days ago that he will order his converted agent [Pakistan President Pervez] Musharraf to shut down the Kashmir mujahidin camps, thus affirming that it is a Zionist-Hindu war against Muslims."

In particular, Western support for the continued occupation of Palestine territory outside its borders by the State of Israel has been declared part of a "war against Islam." Osama bin Laden declared that "the West's rejection of the fairly elected Hamas government is a reaffirmation of the 'injustice, aggression, and rancor' against Palestinians." Enver Masud, an Indian Muslim and author of the book The War on Islam stated that while there are no Muslims in high-level policy making and media jobs in the United States, "Jewish Americans occupy nearly every single position relating to US Arab-Israeli policy." India's control of Muslim-majority Kashmir has been called a "Zionist-Hindu war against Muslims" by Osama bin Laden. In modern day, events alleged to be attacks on Islam include media portrayal of the religion itself and "the War on Terror". Alleged conspiracies against Islam sometimes involve other Muslims who are accused of being apostates. The Ayatollah Khomeini believed that "agents of imperialism", the term he gave to "secular" pro-Western Muslims, were "busy in every corner of the Islamic world drawing our youth away from us with their evil propaganda."

In 2016, the US National Security Adviser said: "Islamism a vicious cancer in body of all Muslims that has to be excised".

The 2005 Danish cartoon controversy were satirical cartoons depicting Muhammad in a Danish newspaper that led to protests and the burning of the Norwegian and Danish embassies in Syria, and were seen by Osama bin Laden as part of the "Zionist-crusaders war on Islam".
In an audio message, Osama bin Laden described the cartoons as taking place in the framework of a "new Crusade" against Islam, in which he said the pope has played a "large and lengthy role" and asserted "you went overboard in your unbelief and freed yourselves of the etiquettes of dispute and fighting and went to the extent of publishing these insulting drawings." "This is the greater and more serious tragedy (than bombing Muslim villagers), and reckoning for it will be more severe." Among others, Iran's Supreme Leader Ayatollah Ali Khamenei blamed a "Zionist conspiracy" for the row over the cartoons. The Palestinian envoy to Washington D.C. alleged the Likud party concocted distribution of Muhammad caricatures worldwide in a bid to create a clash between the West and the Muslim world. After the killing of ISIS leader Abu Bakr al-Baghdadi, a Jordanian commentator writing for the Jordanian newspaper, Al-Dustour, claimed that Al-Baghdadi had been an Israeli agent, who had been trained by the Israeli foreign intelligence service, the Mossad, for a mission to tarnish the image of Islam.

Media

The Universities of Georgia and Alabama in the United States conducted a study comparing media coverage of "terrorist attacks" committed by Islamist militants with those of non-Muslims in the United States.  Researchers found that "terrorist attacks" by Islamist militants receive 357% more media attention than attacks committed by non-Muslims or whites. Terrorist attacks committed by non-Muslims (or where the religion was unknown) received an average of 15 headlines, while those committed by Muslim extremists received 105 headlines. The study was based on an analysis of news reports covering terrorist attacks in the United States between 2005 and 2015.

Religious restrictions

In 2016, seven countries – Belgium, Ethiopia, France, Hungary, Niger and Sweden – used emergency laws that restricted religion within their borders. While the official justifications for these measures varied, Pew Research Center's latest annual religious restrictions study finds that across the seven countries, Muslims, more than any other religious group, were specifically targeted by law enforcement and security services acting in accordance with emergency laws. This fact, along with others, helped place five of these seven countries among the 105 nations, globally, where government restrictions on religion rose in 2016.

Reception
Reactions in the non-Muslim West to the alleged war have varied. Some Western political leaders have dismissed the claims of a war being fought against Islam as untrue, while also being sensitive to Muslim fears of such a "war" and shaping some of their political statements and actions with Muslim fears in mind—including denouncing those who verbally attack Muslims. Other non-Muslims have argued that the truth of a religious war is the other way around—it being Muslims who are waging war against non-Muslims.

Reception in American politics

Following Islamist terrorist attacks both President Barack Obama (following the San Bernardino attack) and George W. Bush (after the 9/11 attacks) made a point of stating that the US was not at war with Islam, instead saying that they were at "war against evil" (Bush) and "people who have perverted Islam" (Obama).

When Republican presidential nominee Donald Trump stated that foreign Muslims should not be allowed to enter into the United States, until the administration can figure out what is going on, Republican Senator Lindsey Graham replied that "Donald Trump has done the one single thing you cannot do — declare war on Islam itself. To all of our Muslim friends throughout the world, like the king of Jordan and the president of Egypt, I am sorry. He does not represent us." Another reaction was that of the Washington Blade, a gay newspaper, which printed a full-page headline stating: "To All Muslims: Trump Does Not Speak For Us." White House Chief Strategist, Steve Bannon, has also been accused of inciting a war against Islam, and has accused Muslims of being a "fifth column here in the United States that needs to be dealt with immediately", and has called Islam "a religion of submission", in contrast with the "enlightened ... Judeo-Christian West".

Madiha Afzal of the Brookings Institution wrote in August 2016 that Trump's allegations of an Islamic war on America were helping ISIS convince Muslims that America is at war with Islam.

Reception in Muslim discourse

A measure of the strength of the belief that a non-Muslim power (the United States) is at least attempting to weaken, if not annihilate, Islam can be found in opinion polls that showed, as of late 2006/ early 2007, strong majorities — at least 70% — in the Muslim countries of Egypt, Morocco, Pakistan, and Indonesia, answering "yes" to the pollsters' question: do you believe the United States seeks to "weaken and divide the Islamic world?"

Daniel Benjamin and Steven Simon write in their book Age of Sacred Terror:

In the Middle East and Pakistan, religious discourse dominates societies, the airwaves, and thinking about the world. Radical mosques have proliferated throughout Egypt. Bookstores are dominated by works with religious themes … The demand for sharia, the belief that their governments are unfaithful to Islam and that Islam is the answer to all problems, and the certainty that the West has declared war on Islam; these are the themes that dominate public discussion. Islamists may not control parliaments or government palaces, but they have occupied the popular imagination.

The idea that the West is waging war on Islam has however been dismissed by many non-Muslims in the west. Salman Rushdie, victim of a Fatwa by Ayatollah Khomeini calling for his death, has argued that what Islamists have called a war of "the west versus Islam" is more complicated. Islamists are "opposed not only to the west and 'the Jews' but to their fellow Islamists", an example being the fight between the Sunni Taliban and the Shia Islamic Republic of Iran. "This paranoid Islam, which blames outsiders, 'infidels', for all the ills of Muslim societies and whose proposed remedy is the closing of those societies to the rival project of modernity, is presently the fastest-growing version of Islam in the world," according to Rushdie.

Western proponents of the "War against Islam" theory
According to James Carroll, the conflict between Muslims and Westerners "has its origins more in 'the West' than in the House of Islam", and can be traced to "the poison flower of the Crusades, with their denigrations of distant cultures," and other Western injustices. Proponents of this view often consider the War on Terrorism with the accompanying 2001 military activity in Afghanistan, 2003 invasion of Iraq to be part of the war against Islam. Western colonialism in the Middle East throughout the 20th century is also regarded as such an attack by some.

See also

 Conspiracy theories in the Arab world
 Conspiracy theories in Turkey
 List of conspiracy theories
 Destruction of early Islamic heritage sites in Saudi Arabia
 Grand Mosque seizure
 Islam and modernity
 Islamophobia in the media
 Islam and secularism
 Islamophobia in the United States
 Persecution of Muslims
 Violence against Muslims in India

Notes

References

Further reading
The War on Islam by Enver Masud

External links

Islam-related controversies
Conspiracy theories involving Muslims
Anti-Islam sentiment
Islamism
Violence against Muslims